North Carolina Highway 410 (NC 410) is a primary state highway in the U.S. state of North Carolina. It serves as the central north–south highway in Columbus and Bladen Counties.

Route description

NC 410 is a predominantly two-lane rural highway that begins at the South Carolina state line and traverses north through downtown Tabor City, mostly along a concurrency with US 701 Business and briefly with NC 904. Heading north, it briefly overlaps with US 701 in the East Tabor area before continuing solo along Joe Brown Highway to Chadbourn. Along Strawberry Boulevard, NC 410 shares a concurrency with US 74 Business, US 76 Business, and NC 130. As it continues north it sheds each other highway off as it travels through northern Columbus County, crossing into Bladen County just after passing through Hickmans Crossroads.

As NC 410 approaches Bladenboro, it begins another concurrency series, starting with NC 242. As it enters the Bladenboro city limits, it also joins with NC 131 before going through Main Street. After crossing over railroad tracks, it meets with NC 121 Business (Seaboard Street), then soon after splits left from NC 242. As NC 410 leaves Bladenboro, it crosses paths with NC 211 Bypass.  later, it splits from NC 131, which continues north to Tar Heel. As it approaches Dublin, it crosses NC 41 and passes Bladen Community College. NC 410 enters Dublin along Third Street and ends at NC 87 (Albert Street).

History
NC 410 was established in 1936 as a new primary routing from US 74/US 76 in Chadbourn to NC 41/NC 87 in Dublin. By 1938, NC 410 was extended south as new primary routing to US 701 in Tabor City. In 1949, NC 410 was extended to the South Carolina state line, replacing US 701, and continuing south as SC 410.

Junction list

References

External links

NCRoads.com: N.C. 410

410
Transportation in Columbus County, North Carolina
Transportation in Bladen County, North Carolina